Suea Pa Road, also written as Sueapa or Sua Pa is a road and intersection in Bangkok. It's a short road in the areas of Pom Prap sub-district, Pom Prap Sattru Phai district and Samphanthawong subdistrict, Samphanthawong district. The road separates from the front of Bangkok Metropolitan Administration General Hospital (BMA General Hospital) and ends at the intersection with Charoen Krung road. It's considered to be the intersection next to the S.A.B. intersection on Charoen Krung road located before Wat Mangkon Kamalawat (Wat Leng Noei Yi), the largest and most well-known joss house in Bangkok.

Suea Pa road was built in the King Vajiravudh (Rama VI)'s reign in 1921 due to the great fire in Tambon Trok Tao Hu on Charoen Krung road. On September 3, 1921, Pom Prap Sattru Phai was severely damaged. Because of the area in the neighbourhood, houses are built to scramble and there's not enough road to prevent danger in a timely manner. Ministry of Metropolitan (today's Ministry of Interior and BMA) by Minister Chao Phraya Yommarat (Pan Sukhum) requested the creation of a new road to the King. HM the King graciously built a new road as required and he gave the name Suea Pa to commemorate the Wild Tiger Corps, his personal affairs.

This road can be connected to Ratchawong Road, which is the road separates from Yaowarat road and toward the Ratchawong pier (N5) on Chao Phraya river includes the old commercial district, Song Wat road and Sampheng lane.

Presently, Suea Pa road is well-known as a large center of wholesale and retail for cell phone accessories and IT equipments with electric equipments alike adjacent Khlong Thom.

References 

Streets in Bangkok
1921 establishments in Siam
Pom Prap Sattru Phai district
Samphanthawong district
Retail markets in Bangkok
Road junctions in Bangkok